The lobster moth (Stauropus fagi), also known as lobster prominent, is a moth from the family Notodontidae. The species was first described by Carl Linnaeus in his 10th edition of Systema Naturae. The English name refers to the crustacean-like appearance of the caterpillar.

Description
The moth has a wingspan ranging from 40 to 70 millimetres. The forewings are grey to grey-brown or green-brown, while the distal part has a slightly lighter colour. There are two bright, jagged crossbands, which are often only dimly visible on the front wings. Between these, the midfield of the wing is usually slightly darker. The hindwings are similar in colour but unmarked.

Distribution
The moth lives in the whole Palearctic realm except the north of Africa; absent in Siberia between Ob' river and Lake Baikal. In Britain it is more frequent in the southern counties

Life history
In the first instar the caterpillar feeds entirely on its own egg-shell and is unusual in that it mimics an ant or small spider. This is due to the long thoracic legs "and caudal appendages which are ever nervously twisting about". If the larva is disturbed during this period it wriggles about violently in the same manner as an injured ant. "The young caterpillars keep guard over their own egg-shell. They keep nervously moving around and about this, and if perchance another caterpillar should approach within touch of it, a vigorous attack is made to drive off the intruder." After the first skin change the larvae feed on the leaves of Acer (Japan), Betula  (British Isles, Finland, Japan), Carpinus (Japan), Castanea (Japan), Castanea crenata (Japan), Cornus (Japan), Corylus (British Isles, Japan), Corylus avellana (Finland), Fagus (British Isles) Juglans regia (Europe), Malus (Japan), Malus pumila (Finland), Prunus (Japan), Pterocarya (Japan), Quercus (British Isles, Japan), Quercus acutissima (Japan), Quercus mongolica (Japan), Quercus serrata (Japan), Salix (Japan), Salix caprea (Finland), Sorbus aucuparia (Finland), Tilia (Japan), Tilia cordata (Finland), Wisteria (Japan) Zelkova (Japan). During the following instars the caterpillar develops even more of an odd appearance with "a large head, (the) long thoracic legs, raised humps on the fourth to seventh segments and a greatly swollen anal segment that has the claspers modified into long thin structures". The general colour is reddish brown and if in its resting position provides perfect cryptic camouflage. The larvae can grow to a length of 70 mm and if disturbed by a potential predator can put on a menacing display with the thoracic legs splayed out and the head arched back over the body. The moth pupates in a strong cocoon, "usually spun up between dead leaves".
The moths emerge the following year from May until July depending on conditions.

References

External links

Lobster moth UKMoths
Fauna Europaea
Lepiforum.de

Notodontidae
Moths of Asia
Moths of Europe
Moths of Japan
Moths described in 1758
Taxa named by Carl Linnaeus